Malandela kaLuzumana was a king of the Nguni, and thus also of the Zulu. His birth and death dates are unknown but he succeeded his father Luzumana kaMdlani as chief sometime in the early 17th century.

Zulu kings
17th-century African people